90,000 (ninety thousand) is the natural number following 89,999 and preceding 90,001. It is the sum of the cubes of the first 24 positive integers, and is the square of 300.

Selected numbers in the range 90,000–99,999

 90,625 = the only five-digit automorphic number: 906252 = 8212890625
 91,125 = 453
 91,144 = Fine number
 93,312 = Leyland number: 66 + 66. Also a 3-smooth number.
 94,249 = palindromic square: 3072
 94,932 = Leyland number: 75 + 57
 95,121 = Kaprekar number: 951212 = 9048004641; 90480 + 04641 = 95121
 96,557 = Markov number: 52 + 64662 + 965572 = 3 × 5 × 6466 × 96557
 97,336 = 463
 98,304 = 3-smooth number
 99,066 = largest number whose square uses all of the decimal digits once: 990662 = 9814072356. It is also strobogrammatic in decimal.
 99,991 = largest five-digit prime number
 99,999 = repdigit, Kaprekar number: 999992 = 9999800001; 99998 + 00001 = 99999

References

90000